Airbourne are an Australian hard rock band formed in Warrnambool, Victoria in late 2001. Founding members are Joel O'Keeffe on lead vocals and lead guitar, his younger brother Ryan O'Keeffe on drums and David Roads on rhythm guitar and backing vocals. They were joined by Justin Street on bass guitar and backing vocals in mid-2004. Roads amicably left in 2017, Mathew Harrison joined in 2018 and after a short tenure was replaced by Jarrad Morrice on rhythm guitar and backing vocals in 2022.

The band's debut album, Runnin' Wild (2007) peaked in the top 30 on the ARIA Albums Chart. It appeared on the United Kingdom Albums Chart and United States Billboard 200. By August 2013, it was certified with a silver award by BPI. Their second album, No Guts. No Glory. (2010) reached the top 20 on the ARIA Chart, top 40 in the UK, top 5 in Germany and also appeared on the Billboard 200. Their third studio album, Black Dog Barking (2013) also reached top 5 in Germany. In 2016, Airbourne released their fourth album, Breakin' Outta Hell, which peaked at No. 3 in Germany. Boneshaker (2019), the band's fifth studio album, appeared in the German top 10.

History

Formation and Ready to Rock (2001–2006)

Airbourne formed as a hard rock band (initially styled as Airborne) in late 2001 in the Victorian city of Warrnambool by Joel O'Keeffe (born ) on lead vocals and lead guitar and his younger brother Ryan (born ) on drums. Joel had played guitar since the age of 11 and Ryan got his first drum kit four years later also at the age of 11. At 17-years-old Joel provided guitar for his father Dennis' vocal performance in January 2000, with his mother Anne on bodhran and vocals, and uncle Colin on tin whistle and vocals.

Airborne initially performed as a three-piece with an unnamed bass guitarist. Joel met David Roads (born c. 1983) when the two worked at the Hotel Warrnambool. The pair brought their guitars to work and, after their shifts, jammed on song ideas. Roads was asked to join the group on rhythm guitar and they rehearsed at the O'Keeffes' home. In November 2002 Warrnambool City Council and Arts Victoria released a Various Artists' CD album, Hard Wired: Youth Compilation Album. Airborne provided two tracks, "Rock 'n' Roll" and "Give It all You've Got", which were recorded at Motherlode Studios, Warrnambool earlier in the year. The CD was given away to local students as well as 300 additional copies provided, "to help further the careers of the eight bands... [get them] airplay and gigs outside Warrnambool."

Adam Jacobson joined on bass guitar early in 2003 and they played regular gigs at the local Criterion Hotel. In March of that year, as Airborne, the four-piece – Jacobson, the O'Keeffe brothers and Roads – won a statewide band competition, Push-On, in Melbourne. Their early material was influenced by Australian rock artists AC/DC, the Angels, Billy Thorpe and Rose Tattoo. Classic Rock magazine's reviewer described how they are, "shamelessly derivative and gloriously entertaining." As Airbourne, they recorded an eight-track extended play (EP), Ready to Rock, which appeared in July 2004 via Field Man Australia, an independent self-funded release. Recorded at Hot House Studios with the band producing while Frank mastered it at Moose Mastering, Richmond for Sik Kitty Production. It was only sold at gigs and by 2017 became, "highly collectable." Pedro B of Sputnikmusic rated it at 3.0 out-of 5, "A valiant first effort by a very young band, but marred by cheesy lyrics, repetition and excessive adherence to source material."

By the time the EP was issued Jacobson had been replaced by Justin Street (born c. 1986) on bass guitar. Ryan had met Street while stumbling home drunk from a party. In early 2005, the band relocated to Melbourne. Their talent manager, Gregg Donovan, handled the negotiations with four major record labels before they signed a five album record contract "for a seven-figure deal" with Capitol Records/EMI Music Australia in October. Initially the members shared a house, where they "lived off bare essentials like cans of baked beans and things like that. We played one gig a month. It was hard in the early days, building yourself up." The group supported Mötley Crüe, Motörhead, Iron Maiden and the Rolling Stones, as well as performing at summer music festivals.

Runnin' Wild (2006–2009)

In 2006 Airbourne travelled to the United States to work on their first studio album, Runnin' Wild, with producer Bob Marlette (Ozzy Osbourne, Alice Cooper). Runnin' Wild was released in Australia on 23 June 2007. Three singles were issued from the album, "Runnin' Wild" (May), "Too Much, Too Young, Too Fast" (June), a playable track on Guitar Hero World Tour; and "Diamond in the Rough" (September). In February Capitol Records culled 70% of their artist roster including cancelling their contract with Airbourne, but the album was still issued in Australia via EMI. In June the band signed with Roadrunner Records for international distribution.

The album peaked at No. 21 on the ARIA Albums Chart in Australia, top 40 on New Zealand's RIANZ Albums Chart and appeared on charts in Austria, Switzerland and France. The group signed a publishing deal in May 2007 with Artwerk Publishing, a joint venture between Nettwerk and EA Games, where the group "will be featured in multiple global EA games later this year." the.Dwarf.com.aus Andrea Batz reviewed the album, "If AC/DC had a son it would be called Airbourne with a little doubt thrown in if the milkman was Iron Maiden!" Batz expanded, "A definite no-holds-barred feast of wreckless, yet well-organised rocker's bliss. Neat and tidy, simple and clean yet filthy, dirty, sexy and gritty. A formula that has evaded artists for quite some time."

During late 2007 the group toured the US supporting Kid Rock and Korn. In September 2007 they issued a five-track live EP, Live at the Playroom. At the ARIA Music Awards of 2007 they were nominated for Best Rock Album and Breakthrough Artist – Album for Runnin' Wild. It was issued in North America, Europe and Japan in January 2008, after which Airbourne relocated to the US. The album reached the Top 100 on the UK Albums Chart and appeared on the Billboard 200.

In a September 2008 interview with Axl Rosenburg and Vince Neilstein of MetalSucks, Joel discussed comparisons with AC/DC, "whoever you are when you come out, especially if you're from Australia and you sound like we do, you're going to get compared to anyone who is out there. It doesn't matter who you are, you are going to get compared to somebody. To be compared to the best rock and roll band in the business, who are still going today and are about to release another album, there is no higher compliment..." In November at the Astoria in London, Dan Hawkins (Stone Gods/The Darkness) joined Airbourne on stage to play the AC/DC song, "Whole Lotta Rosie".

No Guts. No Glory. (2009–2011)

Roads confirmed that in January 2009 Airbourne would enter the studio to begin recording their second album, No Guts. No Glory. In the 17 January issue of Kerrang! magazine, Joel revealed they had written tracks in the Criterion Hotel, "We're getting all our gear plugged in and getting set for Aussie pub rock written in an Aussie rock pub!" The album was produced by Johnny K, mixed by Mike Fraser, and was released on 8 March 2010 in the UK, Europe, Canada, Japan, Australia and New Zealand. The album reached the top 20 on the ARIA Albums Chart, and top 20 in Austria, New Zealand, Finland, Greece, Sweden and Switzerland, while in Germany it peaked at No. 4.

In the US it appeared on 20 April 2010. "Born to Kill", was first played live at the Logan Campbell Centre, Auckland, New Zealand in October 2009. In January 2010, another new song, "No Way But the Hard Way", was played on the BBC Radio 1's Rock Show. On 9 February it was available on iTunes, as the first single from the album. In the UK No Guts. No Glory. reached No. 31, while on the US Billboard 200 it peaked in the top 100. At the 2010 ARIA Music Awards it was nominated for Best Hard Rock or Heavy Metal Album. The band supported Iron Maiden on the UK leg of that group's Final Frontier World Tour from 20 July 2011 starting at Glasgow SECC Arena and ending at Cardiff Motorpoint Arena on 1 August 2011.

Black Dog Barking (2011–2014)

From mid-2011 the band started working on their third studio album, Black Dog Barking. It was recorded at Van Howes Studio, Los Angeles, and The Armoury, Vancouver with Brian Howes producing and was released on 21 May 2013 via Roadrunner. The cover artwork was by Australian artists The Sharp Brothers, who had provided cover artwork for No Guts. No Glory. According to Roads, the title has "Black Dog" as a metaphor for the band's ability to break the rules, especially not to care for dB limits. It was their second album to get into the top 5 in Germany and peaked in top 20 in Australia, Austria, New Zealand, Sweden and Switzerland.

Review aggregator, Metacritic rated Black Dog Barking at 76/100 with a summary, "generally favorable reviews." Guardian Australias Dom Lawson gave it four-out-of-five stars and explained they show, "[an] electrifying verve with which they attack their joyously simplistic songs... the ageless and tireless uniformity of the band's approach that makes this an honest and brazen delight." Kerrang!s reviewer observed, "Very  they come a school uniform away from impersonating their forefathers." Angus Young told that publication, "I really like Airbourne." Black Dog Barking was nominated for another ARIA Award for Best Hard Rock or Heavy Metal Album in 2013. At the end of that year Airbourne toured Europe, supported – amongst others – by the Swedish band Corroded.

Breakin' Outta Hell (2014–2019)

Joel revealed in November 2014 that the band were writing songs for their fourth studio album, Breakin' Outta Hell. In January of the following year, they signed for a worldwide deal with Spinefarm Records. Breakin' Outta Hell was released on 23 September 2016, which was recorded at Sing Sing Studios, Melbourne with Marlette producing again. Metacritic's score of 80/100 indicated, "generally favorable reviews" with Ian Fortnam of Classic Rock observing, "each track's feral combination of barbed-wire riffs, alcohol-numbed throat savagery, crotch-level bass and propulsive, pounding beats, your better judgement simply rolls its eyes as your feet drag you helpless to the dance floor."

The album is the group's highest charting in various countries: Australia at No. 13, Austria at No. 3, Germany at No. 3, Switzerland at No. 4 and UK at No. 9. It was also nominated for Best Hard Rock or Heavy Metal Album at the ARIA Music Awards of 2017. The title track was issued as a single on 8 July 2016.

On 7 April 2017, it was announced via the band's Facebook page that founding rhythm guitarist David Roads would be leaving the band to work in his family business. Joel later explained, that after his years with the group "[he] was having a hard time out on the road, but he loved the fans, though – he loved playing. So now he's back on the farm [working in his family business] and he's happy as hell." Matt "Harri" Harrison (ex-Palace of the King) replaced Roads on rhythm guitar and backing vocals. To celebrate the 10th anniversary of Runnin' Wild, the group issued a compilation album, Diamond Cuts: The B-Sides, in September 2017. Two previously unreleased tracks, "Heavy Weight Lover" and "Money", were added. An associated box set of 4×CDs and a DVD, Diamond Cuts, was also released.

Boneshaker (2019–present)

From March 2019 the band were recording their fifth studio album, Boneshaker, at RCA Studio A in Nashville, Tennessee with production by Dave Cobb. It was released on 25 October 2019, which reached top 10 in Germany and Switzerland, and top 20 in Australia and Austria. Hysteria Magazines Kris Peters observed, "[they] have served up another meat and potatoes take on their beloved genre, following their now sacred formula of no ballads, no acoustic guitars and no keyboards... If you think rock n roll is dying in this country, spend half an hour with this album through your speakers and your doubts will be cast aside." However, The Soundboards reviewer felt Airbourne, "exist in a time where genre regimentation has effectively been dissolved altogether, and sticking to so rigidly to one single reference point only shows more limitations than benefits on paper... It's effectively the fifth time they've made this exact album, rotating through their own tropes with the ease of a band more than content with spinning their wheels, because it'll yield a positive result from their fans regardless."

The band is working on a new album to be released in 2023.

Influences

Airbourne's influences include AC/DC, Bad News, Def Leppard, Iron Maiden, Judas Priest, Pantera, Thin Lizzy, the Angels, Spinal Tap, Status Quo, Motörhead, Metallica, and Rose Tattoo.

Members

Current members
Joel O'Keeffe – lead vocals, lead guitar 
Ryan O'Keeffe – drums, percussion 
Justin Street – bass, backing vocals 
Jarrad Morrice - rhythm guitar, backing vocals 

Former members
David Roads – rhythm guitar, backing vocals 
 Mathew Harrison – rhythm guitar, backing vocals 
Adam Jacobsonn – bass, backing vocals

Timeline

Discography

Studio albums

 TBD (2023)

Compilation albums
 Diamond Cuts: The B-Sides (2017)

Singles

Non album tracks released on various artist compilations

 2002: "Rock 'n' Roll" and "Give It All You Got" (Hard Wired – Youth Compilation Album) (released under their former name Airborne)
 2008: "Turn Up the Trouble" (World Wrestling Entertainment – The Music Volume 8)

Known but unreleased songs

 "Get on Ya bikes"
 "You Don’t Fool Me"

In popular culture

Awards and nominations

ARIA Music Awards

The ARIA Music Awards are an annual awards ceremony that recognises excellence, innovation, and achievement across all genres of Australian music. The first ceremony occurred in 1987. Airbourne have received five nominations.

!
|-
| rowspan=2|2007
| rowspan=2|Runnin' Wild
| Best Rock Album
| 
| style="text-align:center;" rowspan="2"|
|-
|Breakthrough Artist – Album
| 
|-
| 2010
| No Guts, No Glory.
| Best Hard Rock or Heavy Metal Album
| 
| style="text-align:center;"| 
|-
| 2013
| Black Dog Barking
| Best Hard Rock or Heavy Metal Album
| 
| style="text-align:center;"| 
|-
| 2017
| Breakin' Outta Hell
| Best Hard Rock or Heavy Metal Album
| 
| style="text-align:center;"| 
|-

Other awards 
SleazeRoxx.com:
Winner: Best Album (2007) for Runnin' Wild
Voted 12th Best Album (2007) in Sleaze Roxx Reader's Poll for Runnin' Wild
UltimateRockGods.com:
Nominated: Best Rock Vocal Performance (2007) for Runnin' Wild
Nominated: Best Rock Song (2007) for "Runnin' Wild"
Nominated: Best New Artist (2007)
Metal Hammer Golden Gods Awards:
Winner: Best Debut Album (2008) for Runnin' Wild
Classic Rock Roll of Honour Awards :
Winner: Best New Band (2008)

See also

References

External links
 
 
 Airbourne Q&A with Rock Sound
 Interview in the Leicester Mercury, England
 2016 Interview – Australian Rock Show Podcast

 Pictures of the No Guts, No Glory Tour

Australian hard rock musical groups
Australian heavy metal musical groups
Victoria (Australia) musical groups
Musical groups established in 2001
Musical quartets
People from Warrnambool
2001 establishments in Australia
Roadrunner Records artists
Pub rock musical groups
Nettwerk Music Group artists